7 Days to Vegas (also known as Walk to Vegas) is a 2019 American comedy film directed by Eric Balfour. Vincent Van Patten is the co-writer along with Steve Alper.

The film stars Vincent Van Patten, Ross McCall, Paul Walter Hauser, Eileen Davidson, James Van Patten, Willie Garson, Lucas Bryant, Don Stark, John O'Hurley, Chad Lowe, Jennifer Tilly, James Kyson, Danny Pardo, Christina Vidal, Joseph Siprut, Aron Eisenberg, Denise DuBarry, and Kara Weinraub. 7 Days to Vegas would be Eisenberg's last performance as he died on September 21, 2019, one day after the film's release.

Plot

Hollywood big shots bet on anything in "sin city".

Duke is a washed up former actor still living in LA. He runs a local poker game with a variety of characters. One day a director Sebastion joins the game and quickly becomes the best player. While Sebastion is a stereotypical douchebag Hollywood director he has access to the people with more money willing to play and Duke partners up with Sebastion to make more and more money.  The guys have side bets on everything from can you make a paper ball into trash can for $500 to can the little person blindfolded on the roof jump into the pool safely. (Spoiler...he makes it).  The game grows bigger and bigger and Sebastions true colors start to show more and more. He always has an angle and if you make a prop bet with him you can be sure he’s rigged the odds in his favor. Sebastion doesn’t need the money it’s all about winning for him. For Duke this is his only source of income and he steadily saves wads of cash buried in his yard until he’s saved up over $1,000,000.  Through a Ponzi scheme run by Sebastions friend Duke loses everything and Sebastion brags he never invested a dime with the guy.  This is when Duke has had enough and decided to put in motion a series of events that ends with a bet on Duke walking to Las Vegas in 7 days 280 miles with pages of rules and stipulations.  Duke gets $1,000,000 and puts it up against Sebastions $5,000,000 that Duke can do it.  The guys pile in an RV and follow Duke on his 7 day journey filled with prop bets along the way. 
There are plenty of double crosses and things are never what they seem and in the end everyone gets what they deserve... or do they??

Cast

 Vincent Van Patten as Duke
 Ross McCall as Sebastian
 Paul Walter Hauser as Puppet Hank
 Eileen Davidson as KC
 James Van Patten as Carl
 Willie Garson as Danny
 Lucas Bryant as Chucky
 Don Stark as Angry Jim
 John O'Hurley as Walter
 Chad Lowe as Sheriff
 Jennifer Tilly as Jennifer
 James Kyson as Wing
 Danny Pardo as Sandor
 Christina Vidal as Papiana
 Joseph Siprut as Squeeze
 Aron Eisenberg as Peanut
 Denise DuBarry as Denise
 Kara Weinraub as Amanda
 Bianca Rae as Newscaster
 Michael Emory as Big Mike
 Eric Olsson as Jesus
 Dylan Vox as Masked Robber
 Kat Martin as Kat
 Antonio Esfandiari as Antonio
 Mike Sexton as himself
 Nels Van Patten as Hobo
 Renée Willett as Kelly Boots
 Tom Alper as Poker Bore
 Brandon Irvin as Poker Player
 Harvey B. Jackson as Poker Player
 Brandon Johnston as Golf Caddie Twin
 Mitch Johnston as Golf Caddie Twin
 Eduardo Lezcano as Preacher
 Brian Nowak as New Guy
 Ian Salmon as Saxophone Player

Reception

Critical response
Sheri Linden of The Hollywood Reporter wrote in her review: "Walk to Vegas does not take itself too serious."

Richard Roeper of the Chicago Sun Times wrote in his review: "Gambling insiders will recognize the authentic representation of that world throughout the movie. But even if you don't know a busted straight from a royal flush and you've never heard of a prop bet until now, 7 Days to Vegas works as a broad and funny comedy about some truly bent but hilarious characters." He gave the film 3/4 stars.

Bruce Fessier of The Desert Sun wrote in his review: "Its characters are eccentric, if not psychologically disturbed."

Release
7 Days to Vegas was released in theatres on September 20, 2019. The film was released on DVD and Blu-ray on September 24, 2019, by Gravitas Ventures.

References

External links
 
 
 

2019 films
2010s English-language films
2019 comedy films
American comedy films
2010s American films